Isaac Romo González (born March 23, 1983, in Guadalajara, Jalisco) is a Mexican former footballer, who last played for Leones Negros UdeG in the Ascenso MX.

Romo played for Chivas USA of Major League Soccer, arriving as one of imports from parent club Chivas de Guadalajara, and also played for their other child club, La Piedad. He played for the Mexico U-20 team at the 2003 World Youth Championship in the United Arab Emirates.

Romo was released by Chivas USA following the 2005 season. In December 2005, Isaac Romo joined Chiapas under a 6-month-long loan contract, but did not appear in a league match.

In Summer 2015, Romo was transferred to second division promoted team, Cimarrones de Sonora.

External links
 
 
 
 

1983 births
Living people
Mexico under-20 international footballers
Mexican expatriate footballers
Mexican footballers
Footballers from Guadalajara, Jalisco
C.D. Guadalajara footballers
Chivas USA players
Chiapas F.C. footballers
Tigres UANL footballers
Querétaro F.C. footballers
Cruz Azul footballers
Club Puebla players
Expatriate soccer players in the United States
Major League Soccer players
Association football forwards